The Church of Saint-Céneri-le-Gerei is a Roman Catholic church named after Serenicus in the commune of Saint-Cénéri-le-Gérei in north-western France.  It was built in the late-11th and early-12th centuries. It is a listed monument since 1886.

Background 
Construction on the church started in 1089  on a rocky cliff overlooking the Sarthe river on the site of an old church dedicated to Saint-Martin du Mont-Rocheux. It was completed in 1125. The old church had been destroyed by the Normas in the 10th century. The church is built in the Norman style, and contains the traditional nave and transept, with small chapels.  It has a choir with a curved apse. The church was restored in 2006.

References

Further reading 
 

11th-century Roman Catholic church buildings in France
Churches in Orne
Norman architecture